Much Against Everyone's Advice is the second studio album by Belgian alternative rock band Soulwax. It includes a hidden track that can be found by rewinding about 50 seconds before "Conversation Intercom". According to the booklet, it is called "Turn on the A.C.".

Track listing

Belgian/European release
"Conversation Intercom" – 3:06
"Saturday" – 3:11
"When Logics Die" – 3:29
"Much Against Everyone's Advice" – 2:48
"Overweight Karate Kid" – 2:04
"Proverbial Pants" – 4:27
"The Salty Knowledge Of Tears" – 2:42
"Flying Without Wings" – 3:47
"More Than This" – 4:21
"Too Many DJs" – 4:11
"Temptingly Yours" – 2:26
"My Cruel Joke" – 4:23
"Scream" – 3:38
"Funny" – 4:34

UK release
 "Conversation Intercom" – 3:06
 "Saturday" – 3:11
 "When Logics Die" – 3:30
 "Much Against Everyone's Advice" – 2:48
 "Overweight Karate Kid" – 2:04
 "Proverbial Pants" – 4:27
 "More Than This" – 4:22
 "Too Many DJs (New Version)" – 4:31
 "Temptingly Yours" – 2:27
 "Scream" – 3:38
 "Funny" – 4:34

US release
"Conversation Intercom" – 3:06
"Saturday" – 3:11
"When Logics Die" – 3:29
"Much Against Everyone's Advice" – 2:48
"Overweight Karate Kid" – 2:04
"Proverbial Pants" – 4:27
"The Salty Knowledge Of Tears" – 2:42
"Flying Without Wings" – 3:47
"More Than This" – 4:21
"Too Many DJs" – 4:31
"Temptingly Yours" – 2:26
"Scream" – 3:38
"Funny" – 4:34

Certifications

Bonus track 
1997: Wouldn't It Be Good

References

1998 albums
Soulwax albums
Almo Sounds albums
Avex Trax albums
PIAS Recordings albums
Albums produced by Dave Sardy